The Battle of Talladega was fought between the Tennessee Militia and the Red Stick Creek Indians during the Creek War, in the vicinity of the present-day county and city of Talladega, Alabama, in the United States.

Background
When General John Coffee returned to Fort Strother after defeating the Red Sticks at the Battle of Tallushatchee, General Andrew Jackson received a call for help from friendly Creeks who were being besieged by Red Sticks at Talladega.  Jackson and his force of about 2,000 men (about 1,200 infantry and 800 cavalry) were camped at Ten Islands on the Coosa River, near the present day Henry Neely Dam. The Creeks under command of Weatherford numbered about 700 warriors.  A few white men and about 150 friendly Indians known as White Sticks, were inside a small defensive area known as Fort Leslie (it is often called Fort Lashley mistakenly).  Fort Lashley was a palisade constructed around the trading post of a Mr. Leslie.

One of the White Sticks in the stockade was Chief Chinnabee.  His son Selocta Chinnabby, according to legend, put a pigskin with its head still attached over his body and grunted and routed through the surrounding Red Sticks after dark.  When he got to the edge of the encampment he shed the skin and ran through the wilderness until he reached Jackson's camp.

Battle
On November 9, 1813, Jackson's army arrived outside the village.  The Red Sticks inflicted 17 casualties on Jackson's forces.  Jackson inflicted 299 casualties on the Red Sticks and drove them from the field.

Aftermath
Casualties for the Creeks numbered about 300 killed and about 110 wounded. Jackson's casualties numbered 15 killed and around 85 wounded. After the battle, there was a significant lull in the fighting between the Red Sticks and Jackson's army.  By December, the U.S. force was down to almost 500 because of desertion and enlistments running out. In January, in order to support the Georgia militia, Jackson marched toward the village of Emuckfaw with an inexperienced force. This move resulted in the Battles of Emuckfaw and Enotachopo Creek. After these battles Jackson retired to Fort Strother. When Jackson received additional reinforcements (some of the regular U.S. troops), he once again went on the offensive and met the Red Sticks at the Battle of Horseshoe Bend.

Notes

Sources

External links
A map of Creek War Battle Sites from the PCL Map Collection at the University of Texas at Austin.
Holy Ground & William Weatherford

Talladega
Talladega
Native American history of Alabama
Andrew Jackson
Pre-statehood history of Alabama
November 1813 events
Talladega